Major General Anthony Arthur Milton,  (born 19 August 1949) is a retired Royal Marines officer who served as Commandant General Royal Marines from 2002 to 2004.

Military career
Educated at King Edward VI Grammar School in Chelmsford, Milton joined the Royal Marines in 1967 and subsequently became an equerry to the Duke of Edinburgh. He became Commanding Officer of 40 Commando in 1992, in which role he was deployed to Northern Ireland and was appointed an Officer of the Order of the British Empire. He was appointed commander of 3 Commando Brigade in 1995 and, in 1999, Director General for Joint Doctrine and Concepts, a post established following the Strategic Defence Review. He went on to be Commandant-General Royal Marines in May 2002 and took over as British Maritime Commander for Operation Telic – the invasion of Iraq – in April 2003, before retiring in February 2004.

References

1949 births
British military personnel of the Iraq War
British military personnel of The Troubles (Northern Ireland)
Companions of the Order of the Bath
Living people
Officers of the Order of the British Empire
People educated at King Edward VI Grammar School, Chelmsford
Royal Marines generals